Glenealy can mean:

 Glenealy, Hong Kong
 Glenealy School
 Glenealy, County Wicklow, Ireland
 Glenealy Hurling Club, GAA club based in Glenealy, Co Wicklow